Presidential elections were held in Colombia on 3 May 1942. The result was a victory for Alfonso López Pumarejo of the Liberal Party, who received 58.6% of the vote. He took office on 7 August.

Pumarejo's only opponent, Carlos Arango Vélez, was also a Liberal Party member. Whilst Pumajero received support from the Communist Party, Vélez was supported by the Conservative Party.

Results

References

Presidential elections in Colombia
1942 in Colombia
Colombia
Election and referendum articles with incomplete results